Andhra Pradesh Federation of Trade Unions (in Telugu: ఆంధ్ర ప్రదెౕశ్ కార్మిక సంఘాల సమాఖ్య), trade union organization in the Indian state of Andhra Pradesh, related to Communist Party of India (Marxist–Leninist). The organization held its first conference on 23–24 March 2004 in Hyderabad. APFTU publishes Kaarmika Shakthi (Workers' Power). In other states the cadre of CPI(ML) are engaged in other trade unions.

Trade unions in India
Trade unions in Andhra Pradesh
2004 establishments in Andhra Pradesh
Trade unions established in 2004